Christopher Kas and Dick Norman won the title, defeating Jamie Murray and André Sá 2–6, 6–2, [10–8] in the final.

Seeds

Draw

Draw

References
 Main Draw

ATP Roller Open - Doubles
2012 Doubles
2012 in Luxembourgian tennis